Beaufortia pingi  is a species of river loach (family Balitoridae or Gastromyzontidae, depending on the source). It occurs in China (Yunnan and Guangxi) and Vietnam. It inhabits fast-flowing hill streams and grows to  standard length.

References 

Beaufortia (fish)
Taxa named by Fang Ping-Wen
Fish described in 1930
Freshwater fish of China
Fish of Vietnam